The following is a list of centenarians – specifically, people who became famous as sportspeople — known for reasons other than their longevity. For more lists, see lists of centenarians.

References

Centenarians
Centenarian World records
Track and field records
Centenarians